Hedonology (Hedonics), is the study of the impact an injury or incident had on a persons lifestyle.

History 
The Hedonology Institute was developed by Jeffrey Francis Magrowski, Ph.D., CRC, CRE. A trademark for Hedonology was registered in 1990 and abandoned in 1999 while Magrowski attended college and his studies in Vocational Rehabilitation.

The development and use of Hedonics admissibility of scientific evidence for use in the legal system is set by the standard of Hedonic damages to evaluate non-economic damages using the American Juris Jurisprudence method (1988), based on the Frye Standard and supported by the Daubert Test. The determination of present and future pain and suffering is taken into account. Generally, the fact that statistics can be used, but must get the same result was proven in the use of Hedonics.

The Hedonics model and analysis was first accepted in 1991 in United States Claims Court: Joshua Wasson V. Secretary of the Dept. of Health and Human Services, No. 90-208V.  The second case accepting Hedonics in the legal system was in Gary D. Wyatt, Sr. V. The United States of America (Veteran's Administration) 4:94CV1567-DJS September 23, 1996.

An Economist, Stan V. Smith, developed a theory of economic damages (as opposed to non-pecuniary, or non-economic damages) for Hedonic Damages based on the value of a human life by statistical analysis, which has not met the Frye or Daubert Test under admissibility in a court of law in several states.

References 
http://www.nafe.net/JFE/j04_3_am.pdf
Journal of Forensic Economics, 4(3) 1991, pp. 355–367
http://cases.justia.com/us-court-of-appeals/F2/988/131/142052/
Joshua Wasson V. Secretary of the Dept. of Health and Human Services, No. 90-208V,
United States Court of Appeals, Federal Circuit. - 988 F.2d 131

External links
"National Association of Forensic Economists, website"

See also 
Economics
Forensics
Economic damages
Forensic Economics

Compensation for victims of crime
Law and economics
Law of the United States